VH1's Big in '06 was an award show that aired on VH1 on December 3, 2006 on VH1 in the United States. It was the annual VH1 Big Awards. The show was hosted by comedian D. L. Hughley, and featured many guests, including Paris Hilton, Hulk Hogan, Janelle Pierzina, Will Kirby, Danny Bonaduce, Justin Timberlake, Fergie, The Killers, the Fray, "Weird Al" Yankovic, Flavor Flav, Tiffany "New York" Pollard, Britney "Tiger" Morano, Abigail "Red Oyster" Kintanar, Jesselynn "Wire" Desmond, Jenna Jameson, Hayden Panettiere, Tommy Lee, Katharine McPhee, George Takei, Miley Cyrus, Masi Oka, Eva Longoria, David Hasselhoff, Mario Lopez, Joey Lawrence, will.i.am, Perez Hilton, lonelygirl15, Kiefer Sutherland, Xzibit and Dominic Monaghan, and many other celebrities associated with today's pop culture, most being reality tv stars. The show was broadcast across the United States.

List of winners
BIG Entertainer – Dane Cook
BIG Reality Star – Janelle Pierzina
BIG TV Star – Kiefer Sutherland
BIG Music Artist – Justin Timberlake
BIG Web Hit – lonelygirl15
BIG Mama – Britney Spears
BIG Breakthrough – Stephen Colbert
BIG Comeback – David Hasselhoff
BIG "IT" Girl – Katharine McPhee
BIG Outlaw – Paris Hilton
BIG Power Couple – Beyoncé & Jay-Z
BIG Shocker – North Korea tests a nuke

References

External links

VH1 original programming
American music awards
American television awards